Ruthin Community Hospital is a community hospital in Ruthin, Wales. It is managed by Betsi Cadwaladr University Health Board.

History
The hospital, which was designed as an infirmary for the Ruthin Union Workhouse, actually first saw use as convalescent home during the First World War. It became an acute general hospital in the 1930s, a hospital managed by GPs in the 1950s and a community hospital in the 1980s. In July 2012 the health board announced that the minor injuries unit would close and X-ray services would no longer be provided.

References

NHS hospitals in Wales
Hospitals in Denbighshire
Hospital buildings completed in 1914
1914 establishments in Wales
Betsi Cadwaladr University Health Board